This is a list of sound artists. Sound art is a diverse group of art practices that considers wide notions of sound, listening and hearing as its predominant focus. There is contention as to which artists are “sound artists” or if another category might be more accurate such as experimental music, electronic music, sound installation, circuit bending, sound sculpture, builder of experimental musical instruments, noise music, acoustic ecology, sound poetry, installation art, performance art or Fluxus.

Notes

Sound artists